Hamid Jasemian (25 August 1936 – 25 April 2021) was an Iranian footballer.

Biography
He played as a central defender for Shahin Abadan, Shahin F.C. and Persepolis. When he played in Abadan, he denied an offer from  Taj and joined Shahin. He was Persepolis' first ever captain. He died from COVID-19 on 25 April 2021.

References

External links

1936 births
2021 deaths
People from Abadan, Iran
Iranian footballers
Association football central defenders
Iran international footballers
Asian Games silver medalists for Iran
Asian Games medalists in football
Footballers at the 1966 Asian Games
Medalists at the 1966 Asian Games
Shahin FC players
Persepolis F.C. players
Deaths from the COVID-19 pandemic in Iran
Sportspeople from Khuzestan province